Pogonarthria squarrosa, the sickle grass or cross grass, is a species of perennial grass that is native to tropical, East and southern Africa. It is a hard and unpalatable pioneer grass with very low grazing value.

References

External links

Chloridoideae
Flora of Africa